Fuori corso is an Italian television sitcom that was written by Vincenzo Coppola, Ciro Ceruti and Ciro Villano.   Ceruti and Villano star in the comedy.

Season 1
Cosmas and Damian are cousins, the boyfriends of two sisters, Alfina and Alfonsina. They are controlled by their brother, a priest. Over time they become acquainted with Rosario, a Spanish girl living in Italy to study, who pretends to be timid.

The episodes were nothing more than tests, rough versions of what was shown in the later seasons. It was a pilot season to test the show. Ceruti said the first approach of Channel 9 in proposing a sitcom was always to test the show.

See also
List of Italian television series

Italian television series